Dai Jun (born 6 February 1992) is a Chinese swimmer. He competed for China at the 2012 Summer Olympics.

References

 

1992 births
Living people
Chinese male freestyle swimmers
Swimmers from Shanghai
Swimmers at the 2012 Summer Olympics
Olympic swimmers of China
Swimmers at the 2010 Summer Youth Olympics
Olympic bronze medalists for China
Olympic bronze medalists in swimming
Asian Games medalists in swimming
Swimmers at the 2010 Asian Games
Medalists at the 2012 Summer Olympics
Asian Games gold medalists for China
Medalists at the 2010 Asian Games
Youth Olympic gold medalists for China
21st-century Chinese people